Hieracium longipilum, the hairy hawkweed, is a North American plant species in the tribe Cichorieae within the family Asteraceae. It is widespread across much of central Canada and the central United States from Ontario south to Texas and Louisiana. There are old reports of the species growing in Québec, but apparently does not grow there now.

One stalk will produce 10-12 flower heads in a conical or nearly cylindrical array. Each head has 30-60 yellow ray flowers but no disc flowers.

References

External links
Photo of herbarium specimen at Missouri Botanical Garden, collected in Missouri in 1993
Photo by Gerrit Davidse, closeup showing hairs on leaves and stems

longipilum
Flora of North America
Plants described in 1833